The 1943 SANFL Grand Final was an Australian rules football championship game. It was held during World War II and was contested between merged clubs.  -North beat Port–Torrens 82 to 61.

References 

SANFL Grand Finals
SANFL Grand Final, 1943